Thamud is a town in northeastern Yemen.

Climate 
Thamud has a hot desert climate (Köppen climate classification: BWh). The average annual temperature is 24.1 °C. The average annual rainfall is 90 mm.

References 

Populated places in Hadhramaut Governorate